Xanthagaricus is a genus of fungi in the family Agaricaceae. The genus contains 23 species found in India, Sri Lanka, Bangladesh, Thailand, China  and Africa. Originally described in 1984 by Belgian mycologist Paul Heinemann as Hymenagaricus subgen. Xanthagaricus, it was promoted to generic status in 1997.

Species
Xanthagaricus brunneolus
Xanthagaricus caeruleus 
Xanthagaricus calicutensis
Xanthagaricus chrysosporus
Xanthagaricus epipastus
Xanthagaricus erinaceus
Xanthagaricus flavidorufus
Xanthagaricus flavosquamosus 
Xanthagaricus globisporus
Xanthagaricus gracilis
Xanthagaricus luteolosporus
Xanthagaricus myriostictus
Xanthagaricus nanus
Xanthagaricus necopinatus 
Xanthagaricus ochraceoluteus
Xanthagaricus pakistanicus 
Xanthagaricus rubescens
Xanthagaricus rufomarginatus
Xanthagaricus subaeruginosus
Xanthagaricus subepipastus
Xanthagaricus taiwanensis
Xanthagaricus thailandensis
Xanthagaricus viridulus

References

Agaricaceae
Agaricales genera